Shahram Irani is an Iranian military officer of Kurdish ethnicity and the current Commander of the Iranian Navy, appointed since 17 August 2021, replacing Hossein Khanzadi.

References

Living people
Islamic Republic of Iran Navy commodores
Commanders of Islamic Republic of Iran Navy
1968 births
Iranian commodores
People from Sanandaj